Mottle is a pattern of irregular marks, spots, streaks, blotches or patches of different shades or colours.  It is commonly used to describe the surface of plants or the skin of animals.  In plants, mottling usually consists of yellowish spots on plants, and is usually a sign of disease or malnutrition.  Many plant viruses cause mottling, some examples being:
 Tobacco vein mottling virus
 Bean pod mottle virus

Mottling is sometimes used to describe uneven discolored patches on the skin of humans as a result of cutaneous ischemia (lowered blood flow to the surfaces of the skin) or Herpes zoster infections.  The medical term for mottled skin is dyschromia. Although this is not always the case, mottling can occur in the dying patient and commonly indicates that the end of life is near. Mottling usually occurs in the extremities (lower first) and progresses up as cardiac function declines and circulation throughout the body is poor. In animals, mottling may be a sign of disease, but may also be a hereditary trait, such as seen with the champagne and leopard complex genes in horses.

Mottles can also refer to discoloration in processed food, such as butter.

In geology, mottled refers to a patchy/blotch texture of alteration or interbedding, commonly found in limestone and commonly caused by bioturbation.

Mottling can also refer to an undesirable defect which can occur with effect coatings, most obvious on light metallic finishes. The total color impression shows irregular areas of lightness variations. These "patches" are usually visually evaluated, described as a mottling effect. Some also feel that it reminds them of clouds. This effect is especially noticeable on large body panels. It can be caused by the coating formulation, as well as variations in the application process. For example, disorientation of the metallic flakes or film thickness variations of the basecoat can lead to various mottle sizes resulting in a non-uniform appearance. The visual perception of mottling is dependent on the viewing distance: Large mottles can be seen in far distance evaluation, while small mottles are more noticeable in close up evaluation. The visual evaluation of mottling is very subjective, as it depends
on the illumination conditions, the observing distance and the viewing angle.

In graphics printing mottling refers to an uneven coloration resulting from letterpressed printing of textured papers, mainly in larger colored surfaces. Due to the uneven surface, not all fibers of the paper are evenly saturated with color unlike offset printing.

Measurement 

The irregular lightness variations caused by mottling can be objectively measured with specially made instruments. These instruments simulate visual evaluation under different observing angles and characterize clouds / mottles by their size and visibility. Small to large mottles are measured under three observing angles, in which the scan length can usually be varied from 10 to 100 cm. The measurement results are independent of color and curvature of the surface and thus can be considered objective.

The specific measurement process for one such instrument is as follows.
It first optically scans the surface and measures the lightness variations. The specimen is illuminated with a white light LeD at a 15° angle and the lightness is detected under three
viewing angles to simulate visual evaluation under different observing conditions: 15°, 45° and 60° measured from the specular reflection. The mottling meter is rolled across the surface for a defined distance of 10 to 100 cm and measures the lightness variations point by point. The measurement signal is divided via mathematical filter functions into 6 different size ranges and a rating value is calculated for each angle and mottle size. The higher the value is, the
more visible the mottling effect. The measured values are displayed in a graph showing the mottle size on the X-axis and the rating value on the Y-axis. Thus, target values for small and large mottle sizes can be established for paint batch approval as well as process control.

Military

Military battledress often use a mottle pattern, such as Frog Skin and Flecktarn.

References

Plant pathogens and diseases
Skin pigmentation
Color